Maritime Leadership is a non-profit organization based in San Diego. California. They provide sail training, refreshment, mentoring and leadership development to people of various ages and backgrounds. Recipients of the program include foster children, at risk youth, ministers, high school students, wounded warriors and boy scouts.

Ships 
Maritime Leadership operates the tall ship, Amazing Grace. The ship is very complicated and takes a lot of teamwork and communication to sail. Sailing a tall ship creates situations where people are challenged both physically and mentally. Guests are forced to step out of their comfort zones and work together as a team.

The organization occasionally uses a leopard 43 catamaran, Living Free. This vessel sails all over the West Coast. It has made ports from La Paz Mexico up to Gig Harbor Washington.

These ships serve as the platform of Maritime Leadership

References

External links 
  

Non-profit organizations based in San Diego